This is a list of dinosaurs whose remains have been recovered from North America. North America has a rich dinosaur fossil record with great diversity of dinosaurs.

History 
The earliest potential record of dinosaurs in North America comes from rare, unidentified (possibly theropod) footprints in the Middle-Late Triassic Pekin Formation of North Carolina. However, the most reliable early record of North American dinosaurs comes from fragmentary saurischian fossils unearthed from the Upper Triassic Dockum Group of Texas. Later in the Triassic period, dinosaurs left more recognizable remains, and could be identified as specific genera. Examples of later Triassic North American dinosaur genera include Coelophysis, Chindesaurus, Gojirasaurus, and Tawa. Fossils of Tawa-like dinosaurs have also been found in South America, which has important indications about paleogeography. During the Early Jurassic Period, dinosaurs such as Dilophosaurus, Anchisaurus, Coelophysis (formerly known as Megapnosaurus), and the early thyreophoran Scutellosaurus lived in North America. The latter is believed to have been the ancestor of all stegosaurs and ankylosaurs. The Middle Jurassic is the only poorly represented time period in North America, although several Middle Jurassic localities are known from Mexico. Footprints, eggshells, teeth, and fragments of bone representing theropods, sauropods, and ornithopods have been found, but none of them are diagnostic to the genus level.
 
The Late Jurassic of North America, however, is the exact opposite of the Middle Jurassic. The Late Jurassic Morrison Formation is found in several U.S. states, including Colorado, Utah, Wyoming, Montana, New Mexico, Oklahoma, South Dakota, and Texas. It is notable as being the most fertile single source of dinosaur fossils in the world. The roster of dinosaurs from the Morrison is impressive. Among the theropods, Allosaurus, Saurophaganax, Torvosaurus, Ceratosaurus, Coelurus, Ornitholestes, Tanycolagreus, Stokesosaurus, and Marshosaurus are found in the Morrison. An abundance of sauropods has been found there, including Apatosaurus, Diplodocus, Barosaurus, Brachiosaurus, Camarasaurus, Brontosaurus and Amphicoelias. Three genera of stegosaurs, Alcovasaurus, Stegosaurus and Hesperosaurus, have been found there. Finally, ornithopods found in the Morrison include Camptosaurus, Dryosaurus, and Nanosaurus, 

During the Early Cretaceous, new dinosaurs evolved to replace the old ones. Sauropods were still present, but they were not as diverse as they were in the Jurassic Period. Theropods from the Early Cretaceous of North America include dromaeosaurids such as Deinonychus and Utahraptor, the carnosaur Acrocanthosaurus, and the coelurosaur Microvenator. Sauropods included Astrodon, Brontomerus, and Sauroposeidon. Ornithischians were more diverse than they were in the Jurassic Period. Tenontosaurus, Dakotadon, Protohadros, and Eolambia are some of the ornithopods that lived during this time period. Ankylosaurs replaced their stegosaur cousins in the Cretaceous. Ankylosaurs from the Early Cretaceous of North America include Sauropelta and Gastonia. Therizinosaurs such as Falcarius are also known from the Early Cretaceous of North America.

Finally, during the Late Cretaceous Period, the greatest abundance and diversity of dinosaurs of all time lived in North America. During the early part of the Late Cretaceous, the therizinosaur Nothronychus and the ceratopsian Zuniceratops lived. During the Campanian stage of the Late Cretaceous, an enormous diversity of dinosaurs is known. Theropods included the tyrannosaurs Albertosaurus, Gorgosaurus, Daspletosaurus, Teratophoneus, Bistahieversor, and Appalachiosaurus, and the dromaeosaurids Dromaeosaurus, Saurornitholestes, Atrociraptor, and Bambiraptor. Ceratopsians, such as Pachyrhinosaurus, Styracosaurus, Centrosaurus, Monoclonius, Brachyceratops and Pentaceratops also existed. Among hadrosaurs, Hypacrosaurus, Gryposaurus, Kritosaurus, Parasaurolophus, Corythosaurus, Lambeosaurus and Prosaurolophus existed. During the latest Cretaceous, the Maastrichtian age, the diversity of dinosaurs saw a decline from the preceding Campanian stage. North American herbivorous dinosaurs from this time period include the titanosaur sauropod Alamosaurus, the ceratopsians Bravoceratops, Regaliceratops, Triceratops, Leptoceratops, Torosaurus, Nedoceratops, Tatankaceratops (the latter two possible species of Triceratops), and Ojoceratops, the pachycephalosaurs Pachycephalosaurus, Stygimoloch, Dracorex, and Sphaerotholus, the hadrosaurs Augustynolophus, Saurolophus and Edmontosaurus, the ornithopod Thescelosaurus the ankylosaur Ankylosaurus and the nodosaurs Denversaurus, Glyptodontopelta and Edmontonia. Predatory dinosaurs from this time period included the tyrannosaurids Tyrannosaurus, Nanotyrannus (which may just be a juvenile of the former) and Dryptosaurus, the ornithomimids Ornithomimus, Dromiceiomimus, Struthiomimus, the oviraptorids Anzu, Leptorhynchos and Ojoraptorsaurus, the troodontids Pectinodon, Paronychodon and Troodon, the coelurosaur Richardoestesia and the dromaeosaurs Acheroraptor and Dakotaraptor.

The only recorded find of a dinosaur fossil in Central America consists of a single femur discovered from Middle Cretaceous age deposits in Comayagua Department in the central part of Honduras. The fossil had been found in January, 1971 by Bruce Simonson and Gregory Horne, though it was later sent to the National Museum of Natural History, USA where it is deposited under catalogue number USNM PAL 181339. The discovery was not formally described until 1994 where it was identified as the femur of a small hadrosaur or iguanodontid, probably the former. The first report of a dinosaur from Central America ever however was a newspaper article published in August of 1933 by Canada’s Montreal Gazette, though the story was picked up by several American newspapers. The fossil was an isolated metatarsus that had been collected by University of Pennsylvania explorer George Mason from woods near Olanchito, Honduras, though a vertebra was also mentioned to be found by locals. The bones have since been lost and their true identity remains indeterminable.

Criteria for inclusion
The genus must appear on the List of dinosaur genera.
At least one named species of the creature must have been found in North America.
This list is a complement to :Category:Dinosaurs of North America.

List of North American dinosaurs

Valid genera

Invalid and potentially valid genera 

 Agathaumas sylvestris: Most well known from a painting by Charles Knight. It may have been a synonym of Triceratops, but without cranial remains, this cannot be confirmed.
 Alcovasaurus longispinus: Although originally named as a species of Stegosaurus, it may actually be a species of the otherwise European Miragaia.
 Antrodemus valens: May represent the same animal as Allosaurus; if so, the name Antrodemus would have priority. However, because it is based on undiagnostic remains of uncertain provenance, this cannot be confirmed.
 Apatodon mirus: Its holotype was originally believed to be the jawbone of a Mesozoic pig, but has been reinterpreted as a dinosaur vertebra. What type of dinosaur it belonged to is unknown, but there have been suggestions that it was from Allosaurus.
 "Beelemodon": Known only from two teeth found in Wyoming. They share features of compsognathids, dromaeosaurids, and basal oviraptorosaurs.
 "Capitalsaurus": The official dinosaur of the District of Columbia. It is known from a single vertebra discovered at the intersection of First and F Streets S.E., which is now appropriately named "Capitalsaurus Court".
 Cathetosaurus lewisi: Usually seen as a species of Camarasaurus, but an unpublished study argues that it might be a distinct genus.
 Claorhynchus trihedrus: An indeterminate cerapod that may be either a hadrosaurid or a ceratopsid, in which case it may be a synonym of Triceratops.
 "Coelosaurus" antiquus: The generic name is said to be preoccupied, but its namesake remains obscure.
 "Comanchesaurus kuesi": Only named in a dissertation. It has been described as a possible indeterminate saurischian.
 Deinodon horridus: Only known from teeth. Several referred teeth have since been found to belong to already known species, and the holotype could itself belong to Gorgosaurus.
 Dracorex hogwartsia: Described as a small, flat-headed pachycephalosaur. However, it is likely that it is just a juvenile Pachycephalosaurus.
 Drinker nisti: May be a synonym of Nanosaurus.
 Epanterias amplexus: Possibly a large specimen of Allosaurus, but it may be a different taxon due to its younger age.
 Latenivenatrix mcmasterae: The largest known troodontid. It is sometimes suggested to be synonymous with Stenonychosaurus, which its remains were originally assigned to.
 "Magulodon muirkirkensis": Only known from a single tooth that may belong to either an ornithopod or a basal ceratopsian.
 Mojoceratops perifania: May be a species of specimen of Chasmosaurus.
 Nanotyrannus lancensis: Described as a small adult tyrannosaur, although it is more likely to be a juvenile Tyrannosaurus rex.
 Nedoceratops hatcheri: Due to its lack of a nasal horn, it has been named "Diceratops" (which is preoccupied by an insect) and Diceratus. However, it may simply be an unusual specimen of Triceratops.
 Ojoceratops fowleri: May be ancestral to Triceratops or a synonym of Eotriceratops.
 "Orcomimus": Potentially referrable to any of the ornithomimosaur taxa known from the Hell Creek Formation.
 Othnielia rex: Only known from an undiagnostic femur, but it may have belonged to Nanosaurus anyway.
 Othnielosaurus consors: Most likely a synonym of Nanosaurus.
 Palaeopteryx thomsoni: Known from a few very small bones which could belong to either a bird or a small bird-like dinosaur.
 Protoavis texensis: Described as a Triassic bird but is more likely a chimera consisting of elements from various unrelated tetrapods.
 Rhinorex condrupus: Phylogenetic analysis shows that it may fall within Gryposaurus, and thus be a junior synonym of that genus.
 Rubeosaurus ovatus: Likely a species of Styracosaurus, or even simply an unusual specimen of S. albertensis.
 Stygimoloch spinifer: Had a short skull dome with long horns jutting out from behind it. It is usually thought to be a subadult Pachycephalosaurus, but has been noted to be stratigraphically younger.
 Tatankaceratops sacrisonorum: Noted to possess a strange mix of features of both juvenile and adult Triceratops. It may be a dwarf specimen of that genus or an individual that stopped growing prematurely.

Timeline
This is a timeline of selected dinosaurs from the list above. Time is measured in Ma, megaannum, along the x-axis.

See also 

 List of North American birds

References 

North America
†Dinosaurs
.
Articles which contain graphical timelines
Articles containing video clips